Chongqing Helicopter Investment Corporation is a Chinese aircraft manufacturer based in Chongqing, specializing in helicopters.

In 2011, the company announced that it would be working with AgustaWestland on future projects.

The company acquired Enstrom Helicopter Corporation in December 2012 with production facilities in Menominee, Michigan, United States. The company failed for Chapter 7 and ceased operations in 2022.

References

Companies with year of establishment missing
Helicopter manufacturers of China
Manufacturing companies based in Chongqing